Paul Hilton may refer to:
 Paul Hilton (actor) (born 1970), British actor
 Paul Hilton (footballer) (born 1959), English footballer
 Paul Hilton (politician) (1899–1965), member of the Legislative Assembly of Queensland